Bibio marci or St. Mark's fly or hawthorn fly, is a species of fly from the family Bibionidae. It is found across much of Europe. Their common name comes from the fact that the adults usually emerge around St Mark's Day, 25 April.

Biology
Like most bibionid larvae, they grow up in grassy areas and are herbivores and scavengers feeding on dead vegetation or living plant roots. Bibio marci larvae are known to be root damage pests of celery, asparagus, roses, saxifrages, lawn grass, lettuce and Polyanthus. They also feed on a very large number of plant species that are commercially unimportant.

References

External links
BioLib

Bibionidae
Flies described in 1758
Nematoceran flies of Europe
Taxa named by Carl Linnaeus